Purce is a surname. Notable people with this surname include:

 Charles L. Purce (1856–1905), American educator
 Jill Purce (born 1947), British voice teacher, therapist, and author
 Margaret Purce (born 1995), American football player

See also
 Purie
 Purse (surname)